Paulo Soares da Rocha (22 December 1935 – 29 December 2012) was a Portuguese film director. Among his best-known films are A Ilha dos Amores and O Rio do Ouro. A Ilha dos Amores was entered into the 1982 Cannes Film Festival, O Desejado was entered into the main competition at the 44th edition of the Venice Film Festival,  and O Rio do Ouro was screened in the Un Certain Regard section at the 1998 Festival.

Filmography as director
Os Verdes Anos (1963)
Mudar de Vida (1966) 
Sever do Vouga... Uma Experiência (1971) 
A Pousada das Chagas (1972) 
A Ilha dos Amores (1982) 
O Desejado (1988)
"Cinéma, de Notre Temps": Oliveira - L'Architecte (1993)
Portugaru San - O Sr. Portugal em Tokushima (1993)
Camões - Tanta Guerra, Tanto Engano (1998) 
O Rio do Ouro (1998) 
A Raiz do Coração (2000) 
As Sereias (2001) 
Vanitas (2004)
Se Eu Fosse Ladrão, Roubava (2011)

References

Bibliographic references
  O Cais do Olhar by José de Matos-Cruz, Portuguese Cinematheque, 1999

External links

1935 births
2012 deaths
Portuguese film directors
People from Porto
People from Lisbon
Portuguese people of Brazilian descent